The Battle of Weissenstein, or Battle of Biały Kamień, was fought during the Polish–Swedish War (1600–1611), between Sweden and the Polish–Lithuanian Commonwealth on 25 September 1604. The Swedish army was commanded by Arvid Stålarm and the Polish army under Jan Karol Chodkiewicz. The battle ended with a victory for Poland, who sent a relief party against the Swedish forces which besieged Weissenstein castle, modern day Paide in Estonia.

History 
The Swedish army arrived in Estonia in the summer with 6000 troops led by Arvid Stålarm and Spanish mercenary Alonzo Cacho de Canut, and besieged Weissenstein on September 15, 1604. The first Swedish assault was repulsed by fortress crew. Jan Karol Chodkiewicz with 2300 soldiers came up to the rescue on September 25. The battlefield was located between the road from Dorpat to Reval, with marshy streams in the east, west, and south. Weissenstein was located nearby in the marshy valley west of the battlefield.

Seeing the approaching Polish–Lithuanian army, Alonzo de Canut proposed setting loose formation in Spanish style. However, Stålarm, keeping in mind that in previous battles Poles and Lithuanians at first chase away Swedish cavalry, and then cut out infantry, this time he decided to mix infantry and cavalry. The left, stronger Swedish flank, made up of German mercenaries led by de Canut, was based on a narrow causeway and the road leading to Reval. The right flank, composed of the Finns, was weaker but protected with marshy streams. The center, led by Stålarm, consisted solely of Swedish troops. Chodkiewicz, after the analysis of the enemy formation, decided to attack the left Swedish flank, because he believed that the Swedish commander did not expect such a move. Therefore, on the right flank of the Polish Army stood Hussars, on the left - light cavalry, in the center of infantry, reiters and artillery.

Before the Swedes were able to discern the Polish intentions, Chodkiewicz's hussars moved at them, which struck the Germans, breaking the German reiters. Fierce resistance put infantry commanded by Canut. However, when Canut was killed, the left flank was destroyed. After the destruction of the left wing of the Swedish army, Chodkiewicz rushed to attack the right wing and center. When they joined the hussars, the Swedish army was pushed to the swamp. The battle ended with the total defeat of the army led by Stålarm. The Swedes lost 3,000 soldiers, 6 guns, all equipment, and 26 standards (5 of them have been destroyed), while the Poles and Lithuanians lost 50 killed and 100 wounded.

Notes

Weissenstein 1604
Weissenstein 1604
Weissenstein 1604
Weissenstein
Paide
17th century in Estonia
1604 in Europe
Weissenstein